Rajski is a surname of Polish origin.

People having this surname include:

Leszek Rajski (born 1983), Polish foil fencer
Wojciech Rajski (born 1948), a Polish conductor
 Maciej Rajski, a tennis player in the 2015 Pekao Szczecin Open
 Peggy Rajski, an American director of the 1994 short film Trevor

See also
Rajski Do (Serbian Cyrillic: Рајски До), a village in the municipality of Trnovo, Republika Srpska

Surnames of Polish origin